Nico Pérez is a village in the Florida Department of central Uruguay. It is located on the border of the Lavalleja Department.

Geography
It is in close proximity to José Batlle y Ordoñez. They are separated partly by Ruta 7 and partly by the railroad tracks. The two parts are joined by a bridge passing over the tracks.

History
The initial common village here was named "Nico Pérez" and recognized as such by decree of 10 April 1896. On 19 March 1907 it was renamed to "José Batlle y Ordóñez" by the Act of Ley Nº 3.148, at the time head of the judicial section "Monzón". The part of the village that is in the Florida Department, however, kept its original name and its status was elevated to "Pueblo" by the Act of Ley Nº 12.232 on 14 October 1955.

Population
In 2011 Nico Pérez had a population of 1,030.
 
Source: Instituto Nacional de Estadística de Uruguay

References

External links
INE map of Nico Pérez and José Batlle y Ordóñez (Florida)

Populated places in the Florida Department